Shenzhen Goldway Industrial (simplified Chinese:深圳市金科威实业有限公司) is a Chinese manufacturer of medical devices.

In 2008 Royal Philips Electronics acquired Shenzhen Goldway Industrial.  Philips cited the desire to expand in China and emerging markets for the acquisition.

References 

Medical technology companies of China
Manufacturing companies based in Shenzhen
Companies established in 1995
Philips